Minderlittgen (in Eifel dialect: Mannerleehtchen) is an Ortsgemeinde – a municipality belonging to a Verbandsgemeinde, a kind of collective municipality – in the Bernkastel-Wittlich district in Rhineland-Palatinate, Germany.

Geography 

The municipality lies in the Eifel and belongs to the Verbandsgemeinde of Wittlich-Land, whose seat is in Wittlich, although that town is itself not in the Verbandsgemeinde.

History 
In 912, Minderlittgen had its first documentary mention as Lutiaco from King Karl III. The placename's base form is Lutiacum. Over the ages, it has had many names:

912 Lutiaco
1152 Minoris Lideche
1330 Minre-Lyethge
1503 Minnerlietge
1569 Minderlietigh
1728 Minderlötig

Until 1147, St. Maximin's Abbey was the landholder in Minderlittgen. Thereafter the village was held by the Electorate of Trier. Beginning in 1794, Minderlittgen lay under French rule. In 1814 it was assigned to the Kingdom of Prussia at the Congress of Vienna. Since 1947, it has been part of the then newly founded state of Rhineland-Palatinate.

Politics

Municipal council 
The council is made up of 12 council members, who were elected by proportional representation at the municipal election held on 7 June 2009, and the honorary mayor as chairman.

The municipal election held on 7 June 2009 yielded the following results:

Coat of arms 
The municipality's arms might be described thus: Per pale argent a cross gules surmounted by a fleur-de-lis of the field and argent two pallets gules and a canton azure.

Culture and sightseeing

Clubs 
The municipality of Minderlittgen currently has a volunteer fire brigade, a music club, a men's singing club (together with Hupperath), a sport club (Spielvereinigung Minderlittgen-Hupperath e. V.), a tennis club, a church choir, a Möhnen club (association of women who participate in the festivities on Fat Thursday, or Weiberfastnacht) and a church building club at its disposal.

Regular events 
Kappensitzung: a Carnival event staged by the music and sport clubs.
Möhnensitzung: a Carnival event staged by the Möhnen club.
Carnival parade on Shrove Tuesday
Sportfest, staged by the sport club (in Hupperath)
Kermis with music club's concert evening

References

External links 
Municipality’s official webpage 

Bernkastel-Wittlich